Indocnemis is a genus of white-legged damselfly in the family Platycnemididae. There are at least three described species in Indocnemis.

Species
These three species belong to the genus Indocnemis:
 Indocnemis ambigua (Asahina, 1997)
 Indocnemis marijanmatoki Phan, 2018
 Indocnemis orang (Förster in Laidlaw, 1907)

References

Further reading

External links

 

Platycnemididae
Articles created by Qbugbot